Nalband Garji (also Romanized as Na‘lband Garjī; also known as Na‘lband) is a village in Jeygaran Rural District, Ozgoleh District, Salas-e Babajani County, Kermanshah Province, Iran. At the 2006 census, its population was 21.5, in 4 families.

References 

Populated places in Salas-e Babajani County